The 94th Assembly District of Wisconsin is one of 99 districts in the Wisconsin State Assembly.  Located in western Wisconsin, the district comprises most of La Crosse County.  It includes the city of Onalaska and the villages of Bangor, Holmen, and West Salem.  The district is represented by Democrat Steve Doyle, since May 2011.

The 94th Assembly district is located within Wisconsin's 32nd Senate district, along with the 95th and 96th Assembly districts.

List of past representatives

References 

Wisconsin State Assembly districts
La Crosse County, Wisconsin